The 2007 Individual Ice Speedway World Championship was the 42nd edition of the World Championship  The Championship was held as a Grand Prix series over six rounds.

Classification

See also 
 2007 Speedway Grand Prix in classic speedway
 2007 Team Ice Racing World Championship

References 

Ice speedway competitions
World